Stac Biorach (Scottish Gaelic: "the pointed stack") is a sea stack, 73 metres tall, situated between Hirta and Soay (in the "Sound of Soay") in the St Kilda archipelago of Scotland. It lies west of Stac Shoaigh (Soay Stac) (61 metres).

History
The stack has never been permanently inhabited, but has contributed considerably to the local economy by supplying the St Kildans with sea birds and their eggs. Rev. Neil MacKenzie, a Church of Scotland minister who resided on St Kilda from 1830 to 1844, observed the islanders collecting eggs from here in baskets like flat-bottomed bee hives, each basket holding about 400 eggs.

Like the other islands in the St Kilda archipelago, Stac Biorach is extraordinarily rich in birdlife, and boasts the highest colony of guillemots in the archipelago.

Recreational climbing on the stack seems to have started in the early 1880s. It appears that the first non-St Kildan to climb the stack was Richard Manliffe Barrington; he ascended Stac Biorach in 1890, calling it the most dangerous climb he ever undertook. Today climbing in all of the St Kilda archipelago is subject to the permission of the National Trust for Scotland (which rarely, if ever, grants it),  The stack is quite difficult to climb, "one which only a few of the natives could lead."

See also
 List of outlying islands of Scotland

References

St Kilda, Scotland
Landforms of the Outer Hebrides
Stacks of Scotland